William Albert Graham (January 21, 1937 – October 26, 2006) was an American professional baseball player who was a pitcher in Major League Baseball for two seasons in the 1960s.  He played for the Detroit Tigers in 1966 and the New York Mets in 1967, and compiled a 1–2 record, with a 2.45 earned run average, and 16 strikeouts in  innings pitched.

He was born in Flemingsburg, Kentucky, and later died there at the age of 69.

See also 

 Florida Gators
 List of Florida Gators baseball players

External links 

1937 births
2006 deaths
Augusta Tigers players
Baseball players from Kentucky
Birmingham Barons players
Detroit Tigers players
Durham Bulls players
Florida Gators baseball players
Major League Baseball pitchers
Memphis Chickasaws players
New York Mets players
People from Flemingsburg, Kentucky
Syracuse Chiefs players
Toledo Mud Hens players
Valdosta Tigers players
Victoria Rosebuds players